Ursula Nordstrom (February 2, 1910 – October 11, 1988) was publisher and editor-in-chief of juvenile books at Harper & Row from 1940 to 1973. She is credited with presiding over a transformation in children's literature in which morality tales written for adult approval gave way to works that instead appealed to children's imaginations and emotions.

She also authored the 1960 children's book The Secret Language. A collection of her correspondence was published in 1998, as Dear Genius: the Letters of Ursula Nordstrom.

Biography

Early life 
Ursula Nordstrom was born in Manhattan on February 2, 1910 to Henry E. Dixey and Marie Nordstrom, vaudeville comedians, and grew up in New York City. She took business courses at The Scudder School for Girls in New York.

Career 
Nordstrom was hired in 1936 as a clerk in the textbook department of Harper & Brothers, and later as an assistant in the Harper Books for Boys and Girls section for Louise Raymond. She was promoted to Harper's editor in chief of the Department of Books for Boys and Girls in 1940 after Raymond adopted a baby girl and announced her retirement. In 1960, she became Harper's first female vice president.

Nordstrom disliked the genteel, sentimental tone of American children's literature and sought to bring children crimes and punishments of fellow miscreants with books like Maurice Sendak's Where the Wild Things Are (1963) and Louise Fitzhugh's Harriet the Spy and The Long Secret. Her unorthodox outlook on publishing and lack of educational pedigree is best summed up by her motto “good books for bad children." For Nordstrom and her authors and illustrators, it was felt that the best book results when author and illustrator have a good working relationship, which gave way to partnerships between Ruth Krauss and Maurice Sendak and Margaret Wise Brown and Clement Hurd.

Many of her colleagues and competition thought her books were ahead of their time. Nordstrom edited some of the milestones of children's literature, including E. B. White's Stuart Little (1945) and Charlotte's Web (1952), Margaret Wise Brown's Goodnight Moon (1947), Crockett Johnson's Harold and the Purple Crayon (1955), Syd Hoff's Danny and the Dinosaur (1958), Karla Kuskin's Roar and More (1956), and Shel Silverstein's Where the Sidewalk Ends (1974). Other authors she edited included Laura Ingalls Wilder, Ruth Krauss, Charlotte Zolotow, John Steptoe, M.E. Kerr, and Arnold Lobel. Harper's books received three Newbery Medals and two Caldecott Medals during her tenure.

Nordstrom stepped down as publisher in 1973, but continued on as senior editor with her own imprint, Ursula Nordstrom Books, until 1979. She was succeeded at Harper's by her protege, author Charlotte Zolotow, who began her career as Nordstrom's stenographer.

Death and legacy
In 1972, Nordstrom was a recipient of the Women's National Book Association's Constance Lindsay Skinner Award. In 1980, she was the first woman and children's publisher to receive the Association of American Publishers' Curtis Benjamin Award.

Nordstrom died in 1988, aged 78, from ovarian cancer. With her at the time of death was her longtime companion, Mary Griffith. In 1989, she was posthumously inducted into the Publishing Hall of Fame. In 1998, Nordstrom's personal correspondence was published as Dear Genius: The Letters of Ursula Nordstrom (illustrated by Maurice Sendak), edited by Leonard S. Marcus.

Publishing highlights

Bibliography  
 The Secret Language, 1960

References

External links
 

1910 births
1988 deaths
People from Manhattan
American book publishers (people)
American book editors
American children's writers
Children's book publishers
American LGBT writers
Deaths from ovarian cancer
Deaths from cancer in Connecticut
20th-century American businesspeople
20th-century LGBT people